is a Japanese football player for Grulla Morioka.

Club statistics
Updated to 23 February 2016.

References

External links

Profile at Football Lab

1986 births
Living people
Fukuoka University alumni
Association football people from Tokyo
Japanese footballers
J3 League players
Iwate Grulla Morioka players
Association football defenders